Dresden Government Region was one of the government regions (Regierungsbezirke) of Saxony from 1991 to 2008.

Geography of Saxony